The Tin Woodman of Oz:  A Faithful Story of the Astonishing Adventure Undertaken by the Tin Woodman, Assisted by Woot the Wanderer, the Scarecrow of Oz, and Polychrome, the Rainbow's Daughter is the twelfth Land of Oz book written by L. Frank Baum and was originally published on May 13, 1918.  The Tin Woodman is reunited with his Munchkin sweetheart Nimmie Amee from the days when he was flesh and blood.  This was a back-story from Baum's 1900 novel, The Wonderful Wizard of Oz.

The book was dedicated to the author's grandson Frank Alden Baum.

Plot summary

The Tin Woodman and the Scarecrow are regaling each other with tales at the Woodman's palace in the Winkie Country when a Gillikin boy named Woot wanders in. After he is fed and rested, Woot asks the Woodman how he came to be made of tin.

He relates how the Wicked Witch of the East enchanted his axe and caused him to chop his body parts off limb by limb, because he was in love with her ward, Nimmie Amee. Each chopped limb was replaced by the tinsmith Ku-Klip with a counterpart made of tin. (Since Oz is a fairyland, no one can die, even when the parts of their body are separated from each other, unless those people are witches and someone drops a house onto them.) Without a heart, the Tin Woodman felt he could no longer love Nimmie Amee and he left her. Dorothy and the Scarecrow found him after he had rusted in the forest (an event related in The Wonderful Wizard of Oz) and went with him to the Emerald City where the Wizard gave him a heart. Woot suggests that the heart may have made him kind, but it did not make him loving, or he would have returned to Nimmie Amee. This shames the Tin Woodman and inspires him to journey to the Munchkin Country and find her.

The Tin Woodman, the Scarecrow, and Woot journey into the Gillikin Country and encounter the inflatable Loons of Loonville, whom they escape by popping several of them. They descend into Yoop Valley, where the giantess Mrs. Yoop dwells, who transforms the travelers into animals for her amusement, just as she has already done to Polychrome, the Rainbow's Daughter. Woot steals a magic apron that opens doors and barriers at the wearer's request, enabling the four to escape. Woot, as a green monkey, narrowly avoids becoming a jaguar's meal by descending further into a den of subterranean dragons. After escaping that ordeal, Woot, the Tin Woodman as a tin owl, the Scarecrow as a straw-stuffed bear, and Polychrome as a canary turn south into the Munchkin Country.

They arrive at the farm of Jinjur, who renews her acquaintance with them and sends to the Emerald City for help. Dorothy and Ozma arrive and Ozma easily restores the Scarecrow and the Tin Woodman to their rightful forms. Polychrome takes several steps to restore to her true form. However, Ozma discovers that the Green Monkey into which Woot is transformed has to be someone's form; it cannot be destroyed. Polychrome suggests as a punishment for wickedness that Mrs. Yoop the giantess be made into the Green Monkey, and Ozma thus succeeds in restoring Woot to his proper form.

The Tin Woodman, the Scarecrow, Woot, and Polychrome resume their quest and come upon the spot where the Tin Woodman had rusted and find another tin man there. After they oil his joints, he identifies himself as Captain Fyter, a soldier who courted Nimmie Amee after the Woodman had left her. The Wicked Witch of the East had made Fyter's sword do what the Woodman's axe had done—cut off his limbs, which Ku-Klip replaced with tin limbs. He does not have a heart either, but this does not bother him. However, he can rust, which he does one day during a rainstorm. Both woodmen now seek the heart of Nimmie Amee, agreeing to let her choose between them.

The five come to the dwelling of the tinsmith Ku-Klip where the Tin Woodman talks to himself—that is, to the head of the man (Nick Chopper) he once was. The Tin Woodman and the Tin Soldier also find a barrel of assorted body parts that once belonged to each of them, but some, like Captain Fyter's head, are conspicuously missing. Ku-Klip reveals that he used Fyter's head and many body parts from each of them (which never decayed) to create his assistant Chopfyt. Chopfyt complained about missing an arm until Ku-Klip made him a tin one, and he departed for the east.

The companions leave Ku-Klip and continue east themselves to find Nimmie Amee and find themselves crossing the Invisible Country, where a massive Hip-po-gy-raf helps them across in return for the Scarecrow's straw. Reluctantly, he gives it and consents to being stuffed with available hay, which makes his movements awkward. They rest for the night at the house of Professor and Mrs. Swynne, pigs whose nine children live in the Emerald City under the care of the Wizard.

They leave the Swynnes and arrive at the foot of Mount Munch on the eastern border of the Munchkin Country. At its summit is a cottage where a rabbit tells them Nimmie Amee now lives happily. The Tin Woodman and Tin Soldier knock and are admitted by Nimmie Amee, who is now married to Chopfyt. She refuses to leave her domestic life, even to become Empress of the Winkies (which she would become as the Tin Woodman's wife), saying "All I ask is to be left alone and not be disturbed by visitors."  The four return to the Emerald City and relate their adventures. Woot is allowed free rein to roam where he pleases, Captain Fyter is dispatched by Ozma to guard duty in the Gillikin Country, and the Tin Woodman and Scarecrow return to his palace in the Winkie Country where the story began.

Context and reception
The Tin Woodman of Oz provides backstory for Oz itself; it was not always a fairyland, and became one by being enchanted by the Fairy Queen Lurline, who left a fairy behind to rule it. In Glinda of Oz Ozma says that she herself was that fairy, though in The Marvelous Land of Oz we are told of her restoration to a throne long held by her ancestors.

In any event, this novel marks a clear maturation of Ozma's character, now said to appear significantly older than Dorothy (in Ozma of Oz they appeared the same age) and a fairy working her own innate magic.

Baum's Oz books had entered a trend of declining sales after 1910. The Tin Woodman of Oz reversed this trend; its first-year sales of 18,600 were enough to make it a "bestselling success." Significantly, the sales of earlier Oz titles also rebounded from previous declines, many selling 3000 copies that year, and two, The Marvelous Land of Oz (1904) and the previous year's The Lost Princess of Oz (1917), selling 4000 copies. Baum earned $6,742.52 from his Oz books that year. (In 1918 the average annual salary of a clerical worker was $940.) Even Baum's non-Oz-related early works were affected by the upsurge: John Dough and the Cherub (1906) sold 1,562 copies in 1918.

The reason for this reversal of fortune is harder to specify. The psychological shock of the trench-warfare carnage of World War I may have inspired a wave of nostalgia for a simpler time, with Baum's books representing a lost "age of innocence".

A new edition of the book was illustrated by Dale Ulrey in 1955.  She illustrated a new edition of The Wizard of Oz for Reilly & Lee the following year, but sales did not warrant her continuing to provide new illustrations.

See also

References

External links

 The Tin Woodman of Oz (illustrated) at Project Gutenberg
 
 

1918 American novels
1918 children's books
1918 fantasy novels
Oz (franchise) books
Sequel novels